The Jericho Jewish Center (JJC) is a Conservative Jewish congregation located in Jericho, New York. The congregation was established in 1955, when it began meeting on a local private estate. Construction of the Jericho Jewish Center synagogue began in June 1959, and was completed in 1960. The Iken STEM Science Academy Preschool, housed in the Jericho Jewish Center, opened in 2016.

References

External links
 

Jewish organizations established in 1955
Conservative synagogues in New York (state)
Synagogues in Nassau County, New York
1955 establishments in New York (state)
Synagogues completed in 1960